Kagurazaka Station (神楽坂駅, Kagurazaka-eki) is a train station in Shinjuku, Tokyo, Japan. Its station number is T-05. The station exit faces Waseda Dōri, uphill from the Kagurazaka intersection and nearby Akagi Shrine.


Line
Tokyo Metro -

Station layout

History 
Kagurazaka Station opened on 23 December 1964.

The station facilities were inherited by Tokyo Metro after the privatization of the Teito Rapid Transit Authority (TRTA) in 2004.

References

External links

Tokyo Metro station information

Railway stations in Japan opened in 1964
Stations of Tokyo Metro
Tokyo Metro Tozai Line
Railway stations in Tokyo